The Captain's Table is a 1936 British crime film directed by and starring Percy Marmont. It also featured Marian Spencer and Louis Goodrich.  The film was made at Shepperton Studios as a quota quickie for distribution by Metro-Goldwyn-Mayer.

Plot
A passenger on an Atlantic liner is found strangled, leading to a police investigation.

Cast
 Percy Marmont - John Brooke
 Marian Spencer - Ruth Manning
 Louis Goodrich - Captain Henderson
 Daphne Courtney - Mary Vaughan
 Mark Daly - Sanders
 Phillip Brandon - Eric Manning
 Hugh McDermott - Inspector Mooney

References

Bibliography
 Chibnall, Steve. Quota Quickies: The British of the British 'B' Film. British Film Institute, 2007.
 Low, Rachael. Filmmaking in 1930s Britain. George Allen & Unwin, 1985.
 Wood, Linda. British Films, 1927-1939. British Film Institute, 1986.

External links

1936 films
1936 crime films
British crime films
Films directed by Percy Marmont
Films shot at Shepperton Studios
Seafaring films
Films with screenplays by John Paddy Carstairs
British black-and-white films
Films about murder
1930s English-language films
1930s British films